Tristan Murail (born 11 March 1947) is a French composer associated with the "spectral" technique of composition. Among his compositions is the large orchestral work Gondwana.

Early life and studies
Murail was born in Le Havre, France. His father, Gérard Murail, is a poet and his mother, Marie-Thérèse Barrois, a journalist. One of his brothers, Lorris Murail, and his younger sister Elvire Murail, a.k.a. Moka, are also writers, and his younger sister Marie-Aude Murail is a French children's writer.

Following his university studies in Arabic and economics, Murail attended the Paris Conservatory, where he studied composition with Olivier Messiaen from 1967 to 1972. He taught computer music and composition at IRCAM in Paris from 1991 to 1997. While there, he assisted in the development of Patchwork composition software. In 1973 he was a founding member of the Ensemble l'Itinéraire. From 1997 until 2010, he was a professor of composition at Columbia University in New York City.

Music
Murail is associated with the "spectral" technique of composition, which involves the use of the fundamental properties of sound as a basis for harmony, as well as the use of spectral analysis, FM, RM, and AM synthesis as a method of deriving polyphony.

Major pieces by Murail include large orchestral pieces such as Gondwana, Time and Again and, more recently, Serendib and L'Esprit des dunes. Other pieces include his Désintégrations for 17 instruments and tape, Mémoire/Erosion for French horn and nine instruments Ethers for flute and ensemble, Winter Fragments for flute, clarinet, piano, violin, cello and electronics as well as Vampyr! for electric guitar.

Murail also composed a set of solo pieces for various instruments in his cycle Random Access Memory, of which the sixth, Vampyr!, is a rare classical piece for electric guitar. In addition to deriving much of the musical material from the harmonic series over a low E—typically the lowest note on the instrument— the composer also references the timbre and performance style of guitarists in the rock tradition, citing Carlos Santana and Eric Clapton as examples in the instructions to the score.

Among Murail's awards are the Prix de Rome (presented by the French Académie des beaux-arts in 1971), the Grand Prix du Disque (1990), and the Grand Prix du Président de la République, Académie Charles Cros (1992).

Murail's works are published by Éditions Transatlantiques and Éditions Henry Lemoine. His music has been recorded on the Una Corda, Metier, Adés, and MFA-Radio France labels.

Works

Orchestral
1970, Altitude 8000, for orchestra
1972, Au-delà du mur du son, for large orchestra
1973, La dérive des continents, for viola and string orchestra
1973, Cosmos privé, for orchestra
1975, Sables, for orchestra
1979, Les courants de l'espace, for ondes Martenot and small orchestra
1980, Gondwana, for orchestra
1985, Sillages, for orchestra
1985, Time and again, for orchestra
1991, La dynamique des fluides, for orchestra
1996 Le partage des eaux, for large orchestra
2004, Terre d'ombre, for large orchestra and electronic sounds
2007, Contes cruels, for 2 electric guitars and orchestra
2013, Reflections / Reflets I - Spleen
2013, Reflections / Reflets II - High Voltage / Haute tension
2017, Reflections / Reflets III - Vents et marées / Tidal winds

Concertante
2012, Le Désenchantement du Monde, piano concerto
2019, De Pays et d'Hommes Étranges, cello concerto
2021, 'L'Oeil du Cyclone', piano concerto

Ensemble
1969, Couleur de mer, for 15 instruments
1972, L'Attente, for 7 instruments
1976, Mémoire/Erosion, for horn and ensemble
1978, Ethers, for 6 instruments
1978, Treize couleurs du soleil couchant, for ensemble
1982, Désintégrations, for 17 instruments and electronic sounds
1990, Allégories, for 6 instruments and electronic sounds
1992, Serendib, for 22 musicians
1993, La Barque mystique for ensemble
1994, L'Esprit des dunes, for ensemble
1996, Bois flotté, for piano, trombone, string trio, synthetic sounds and synthesized sounds
2000, Winter Fragments, for flute, clarinet, piano, violin, cello, MIDI keyboard and computer
2001, Le Lac, for ensemble
2006, Légendes urbaines for 22 instruments
2006, Seven Lakes Drive, from «Portulan», for flute, clarinet, horn, piano, violin and cello
2008, Liber fulguralis, for ensemble, electronics and video
2011, La Chambre des cartes, from «Portulan», for flute, clarinet, horn, piano, percussions, violin, viola and cello
2011, Lachrymae, for alto flute and string quintet
2011, Dernières nouvelles du vent d'ouest, from «Portulan», for viola, horn, piano and percussion
2012, The Bronze Age, for flute, clarinet, trombone, violin, cello and piano
2014, Un Sogno, for ensemble and electronics
2017, Near Death Experience d'après L'Ile des morts d'Arnold Böcklin, for ensemble and video

Chamber
1970, Où tremblent les contours, for 2 violas
1973, Les Nuages de Magellan, for 2 ondes Martenot, electric guitar and percussions
1974, Transsahara express, for bassoon and piano
1986, Atlantys, for 2 DX7 Yamaha synthesizers, from Random Access Memory
1988, Vues aériennes, for horn, violin, cello and piano 
1990, Le fou à pattes bleues, for flute and piano
1993, La barque mystique, for five instruments
1998, Feuilles à travers les cloches, from «Portulan», for flute, violin, cello and piano
2006, Les Ruines circulaires, from «Portulan», for clarinet and violin
2008, Garrigue, from «Portulan», for bass flute, viola, cello and percussions
2015, Travel Notes, for 2 pianos and 2 percussions
2016, Sogni, ombre et fumi, for string quartet
2018, Stalag VIIIA, for violin, clarinet, cello and piano
2018, Une lettre de Vincent, for flute and cello
2019, Kinderszenen by Robert Schumann, rereading for flute, cello and piano

Solo instrument
1967, Comme un Oeil Suspendu et Poli par le Songe…, for piano
1972, Estuaire, 2 pieces for piano
1976, C'est un jardin secret, ma sœur, ma fiancée, une fontaine close, une source scellée for viola solo
1977, Tellur, for guitar
1977, Territoires de l'oubli, for piano
1984, Vampyr!, for electric guitar, from Random Access Memory
1992, Attracteurs étranges, for cello
1992, Cloches d’adieu, et un sourire... in memoriam Olivier Messiaen, for piano
1993, La Mandragore, for piano
1995, Unanswered questions, for flute
2002, Les travaux et les jours, for piano
2018, Cailloux dans l'eau, for piano
2019, Le Rossignol en amour, for piano

Vocal
1995, ...amaris et dulcibus aquis..., for chorus and electronic sounds
2010, Les sept Paroles, for orchestra, chorus and electronics
2016, La Vallée close, sur des sonnets de Pétrarque

References

Specialty studies
 Humbertclaude Éric (1999), La Transcription dans Boulez et Murail: de l’oreille à l’éveil, Harmattan,

External links
Tristan Murail official site
Editions Henry Lemoine, Paris
Excerpt from Tristan Murail lecture from Ostrava Days 2003, August 18, 2003
Tristan Murail at CompositionToday.com
 

1947 births
20th-century classical composers
21st-century classical composers
Columbia University faculty
Conservatoire de Paris alumni
Living people
French classical composers
French male classical composers
Academic staff of Mozarteum University Salzburg
Musicians from Le Havre
20th-century French composers
21st-century French composers
20th-century French male musicians
21st-century French male musicians